Andy Ricker (born 1963) is an American chef, restaurateur and cookery writer, known for his skill and expertise in northern Thai cuisine.

Career
Beginning his working life as a dishwasher in Vermont when he was a teenager, he accumulated culinary knowledge whilst backpacking and working and staging in restaurants in countries such as New Zealand, Australia and Thailand, and at Raymond Blanc's Michelin star restaurant Le Manoir aux Quat' Saisons near Oxford, England. His first visit to Thailand was in 1987. From 1992 onward, he continued his travels to Thailand, staying there for several months each year to study Thai food culture.

Restaurants and bars
 Pok Pok, Portland (November 2005)
 Ping (2009–2012; 2020–2021)
 Whiskey Soda Lounge, Portland (December, 2009)
 Pok Pok Noi (March 2011)
 Pok Pok Wing (renamed: Pok Pok Phat Thai) (January 2012)
 Pok Pok Ny, New York (April 2012)
 Sen Yai, Portland (May 2013)
 Whiskey Soda Lounge Ny, New York (August 2013)
 Pok Pok Phat Thai, LA (November 2014)
 Pok Pok LA (October 2015)
 Pok Pok NW (Spring 2017)

Awards
 2007: "Restaurant of the Year" by The Oregonian for Pok Pok in Portland
 2009: GQ Magazine's "Top Ten Best New Restaurants in America"
 2011: James Beard Foundation Award: Best Chef, Northwest for his restaurant Pok Pok in Portland in 2011
 2014: James Beard Foundation's annual Book, Broadcast and Journal Awards, in the category "cooking, recipes or instruction" for the article "The Star of Siam: Thai Curries" in Saveur magazine
 2014: IACP Award in the category "Instructional Culinary Writing" for the article "The Star of Siam: Thai Curries" in Saveur magazine
 2014: Pok Pok Ny receives a star in the 2015 Michelin Guide for New York City

Books
 Pok Pok: Food and Stories from the Streets, Homes, and Roadside Restaurants of Thailand (co-author J.J. Goode, photographer Austin Bush, foreword by chef David Thompson, 2013)

Television
 Anthony Bourdain: No Reservations, Brooklyn, November 2012
 Anthony Bourdain: Parts Unknown, Thailand, June 2014
 Farang, the story of chef Andy Ricker by VICE Films, July 2014
 The Taste, Bring the Heat, January 2015

See also
 James Beard Foundation Award: 2010s

References

External links
 Official website of Andy Ricker's restaurants and bars

Living people
1964 births
American chefs
American food writers
American male chefs
American cookbook writers
James Beard Foundation Award winners
Thai cuisine
Thai-American culture